The Byzantine Institute of America is an organization founded for the preservation of Byzantine art and architecture.

History 
Working with the Turkish government and President Mustafa Kemal Atatürk, its greatest notable success is the preservation of the mosaics in Hagia Sophia starting in June 1931.  The institute is located in the Dumbarton Oaks Research Library and Collection, in Washington, D.C.  The institute's founder was the scholar and archaeologist Thomas Whittemore.

External links
 Dumbarton Oaks Research Library and Collection, in Washington, DC.  http://www.doaks.org/ 
 Guide to the Byzantine Institute and Dumbarton Oaks fieldwork records and papers
 Work of the Byzantine Institute in Hagia Sophia
 Notes on the work of the Byzantine Institute in Istanbul 1957-1959

Institute
Arts organizations based in Washington, D.C.